Anna Chatterton is a Canadian playwright, who was shortlisted for the Governor General's Award for English-language drama at the 2017 Governor General's Awards for her play Within the Glass.

She was educated in theatre at Concordia University, and in creative writing at the University of Guelph, before becoming playwright in residence at Tarragon Theatre in 2011. Her first play, Quiver, was written as her master's thesis for her MFA at Guelph. Within the Glass premiered at Tarragon in 2016.

She is also a regular collaborator with Evalyn Parry and Karin Randoja in the theatre collective Independent Aunties. Their plays as a collective have included Francesca, Mathilda and Tea, The Mysterious Shorts, Clean Irene and Dirty Maxine, Breakfast and Gertrude and Alice. Gertrude and Alice was a shortlisted finalist for the Governor General's Award for English-language drama at the 2018 Governor General's Awards. Chatterton's play Cowgirl Up was supposed to premiere in April 2020, but was postponed due to COVID-19.

References

21st-century Canadian dramatists and playwrights
Canadian women dramatists and playwrights
Canadian stage actresses
Writers from Toronto
Actresses from Toronto
Concordia University alumni
University of Guelph alumni
Living people
21st-century Canadian women writers
Year of birth missing (living people)